Brandon Alex Taylor (born January 29, 1990) is a former American football safety. He played college football at Louisiana State University. The Chargers selected him with the 73rd overall pick in the third round of the 2012 NFL draft, in which he was considered one of the top safety prospects.

College career
Taylor attended Louisiana State University from 2008 to 2011. During his career he started 33 of 49 games and recorded 160 tackles, four interceptions and a sack.

Professional career
Taylor was selected in the third round with the 73rd overall pick by the San Diego Chargers in the 2012 NFL Draft. On December 26, 2012, he was placed on injured reserve due to a knee injury. On June 19, 2014, Taylor was waived from the Chargers.

Personal life
His older brother is safety Curtis Taylor, who was selected by the San Francisco 49ers in the seventh round of the 2009 NFL draft after also playing for LSU.

References

External links
LSU Tigers bio
San Diego Chargers bio

1990 births
Living people
American football safeties
LSU Tigers football players
People from Franklinton, Louisiana
Players of American football from Louisiana
San Diego Chargers players